The Return of Chandu is a 1934 American 12-episode fantasy film serial based on the radio series Chandu the Magician. It was produced by Sol Lesser and directed by Ray Taylor, and starred Béla Lugosi as Frank Chandler (aka Chandu the Magician). The serial was originally released to be booked by theaters in any one of three ways: as a conventional serial of twelve weekly chapters of equal running times; as a 60-minute feature film comprising the first four episodes, to be followed by the remaining 8 episodes in weekly serial format; or as a stand-alone feature comprising the first four chapters (the fourth episode ending not with a cliffhanger, but with an apparent resolution to the story). In 1935, the remaining 8 episodes of the serial were also edited into a second feature film, of 65 minute length, released as Chandu on the Magic Island. This serial marked one of the few times that Lugosi played a protagonist rather than an antagonist: in fact, Lugosi had played Roxor, the main villain, in the 1932 film Chandu the Magician.

Plot summary 
Frank Chandler (Béla Lugosi in a rare heroic role): a powerful but kind man who has spent most of his life in the Orient, where he is renowned under the name of "Chandu the Magician" for his tremendous skill with White Magic. He is in love with the Princess Nadji of Egypt, who has lately escaped to America and is now staying with the Chandler family at their home in Beverly Hills, California. Princess Nadji believes she has left her troubles behind in Egypt, but when the Chandlers hold a party in her honor, she learns that her life is still in jeopardy, as are the lives of her friends. Chandu, presently arriving home from Egypt himself, is pursued by enemies at the airport, and escapes only by using his magic ring. At the party, some shady guests conspire to poison Princess Nadji, and Chandu arrives just in time to snatch the glass of deadly wine out of her hand.

Chandu explains to Nadji what has happened, and why she is in danger. A cult of Black Magic sorcerers, the Sect of Ubasti, have recently recovered the perfectly preserved body of their last high priestess, Ossana. Legend tells that Ossana will one day be resurrected and will rule the "lost continent" of Lemuria again; however, in order to resurrect her, the Ubasti must make a human sacrifice, and the sacrifice must be an Egyptian princess of royal blood.  Chandu says: "Princess Nadji is the only living Egyptian princess and the Ubasti will stop at nothing". The cult are determined to capture Nadji and sacrifice her to their god.

The twelve chapters of The Return of Chandu follow Chandu and his family (his sister, his nephew, and his niece) on various adventures while they struggle, by both magical and not-so-magical means, to rescue and protect Princess Nadji from the Sect of Ubasti. Their journey brings them finally to the land of Lemuria itself, where Chandu must decide whether he can renounce his love for Nadji in order to save her life.

Cast 
Béla Lugosi as Frank Chandler, aka Chandu the Magician
Maria Alba as Princess Nadji
Clara Kimball Young as Dorothy Regent
Dean Benton as Bob Regent
Phyllis Ludwig as Betty Regent
Lucien Prival as Vindhyan [Chs. 1-4]
Cyril Armbrister as Henchman Sutra [Chs.1-4]
Murdock MacQuarrie as The "Voice" of Ubasti [Chs. 4-12]
Wilfred Lucas as Capt. Wilson [Chs. 4-12]
Jack J. Clark as Vitras, High Priest of Ubasti [Chs. 4-12]
Josef Swickard as Tyba, the White Magician [Chs. 8-12]

Chapter list 
 The Chosen Victim
 The House in the Hills
 On the High Seas
 The Evil Eye
 The Invisible Circle
 Chandu's False Step
 Mysterious Magic
 The Edge of the Pit
 The Terror Invisible
 The Crushing Rock
 The Uplifted Knife
 The Knife Descends

See also 
 Chandu the Magician, an earlier film in which Lugosi portrayed the character of Roxor

References

External links 

1934 films
1930s fantasy adventure films
1930s English-language films
American black-and-white films
Film serials
Films about magic and magicians
Films directed by Ray Taylor
Films set in Lemuria (continent)
Articles containing video clips
Films produced by Sol Lesser
American fantasy adventure films
1930s American films